The 90th United States Congress was a meeting of the legislative branch of the United States federal government, composed of the United States Senate and the United States House of Representatives. It met in Washington, D.C., from January 3, 1967, to January 3, 1969, during the last two years of President Lyndon B. Johnson's second term in office.

The apportionment of seats in this House of Representatives was based on the 1960 United States census.

Both chambers had a Democratic majority - maintaining a supermajority in the Senate, but losing seats in the House, costing them supermajority status in that chamber. Along with President Johnson, the Democrats maintained an overall federal government trifecta.

Major events

Major legislation

 April 4, 1967: Supplemental Defense Appropriations Act, 
 November 7, 1967: Public Broadcasting Act, 
 December 14, 1967: Uniform Congressional District Act, 
 December 15, 1967: Age Discrimination in Employment Act, 
 December 18, 1967: National Park Foundation Act, 
 January 2, 1968: Elementary and Secondary Education Amendments of 1967, including Title VII: Bilingual Education Act, 
 March 1, 1968: Fire Research and Safety Act of 1968, 
 April 11, 1968: Civil Rights Act of 1968, including Title II: Indian Civil Rights Act, 
 May 29, 1968: Truth in Lending Act, 
 June 19, 1968: Omnibus Crime Control and Safe Streets Act of 1968, 
 July 21, 1968: Aircraft Noise Abatement Act, 
 October 2, 1968: Wild and Scenic Rivers Act, 
 October 2, 1968: National Trails System Act, 
 October 15, 1968: Health Services and Facilities Amendments of 1968, including Title III: Alcoholic and Narcotic Addict Rehabilitation Amendments of 1968
 October 18, 1968: Radiation Control for Health and Safety Act of 1968, 
 October 22, 1968: Foreign Military Sales Act of 1968, 
 October 22, 1968: Gun Control Act of 1968,

Constitutional amendments
 February 10, 1967: Twenty-fifth Amendment to the United States Constitution was ratified by the requisite number of states (then 38) to become part of the Constitution

Party summary

The count below identifies party affiliations at the beginning of the first session of this Congress, and includes members from vacancies and newly admitted states, when they were first seated. Changes resulting from subsequent replacements are shown below in the "Changes in membership" section.

Senate

House of Representatives

Leadership

Senate 
 President: Hubert Humphrey (D) 
 President pro tempore: Carl Hayden (D)
 Permanent Acting President pro tempore: Lee Metcalf (D)

Majority (Democratic) leadership 
 Majority Leader: Mike Mansfield
 Majority Whip: Russell B. Long
 Democratic Caucus Secretary: Robert Byrd

Minority (Republican) leadership 
 Minority Leader: Everett Dirksen
 Minority Whip: Thomas Kuchel
 Republican Conference Chairman: Margaret Chase Smith
 Republican Conference Secretary: Milton Young
 National Senatorial Committee Chair: George Murphy
 Policy Committee Chairman: Bourke B. Hickenlooper

House of Representatives 

 Speaker: John W. McCormack (D)

Majority (Democratic) leadership 
 Majority Leader: Carl Albert
 Majority Whip: Hale Boggs
 Democratic Caucus Chairman: Dan Rostenkowski
 Democratic Caucus Secretary: Leonor Sullivan
 Democratic Campaign Committee Chairman: Michael J. Kirwan

Minority (Republican) leadership 
 Minority Leader: Gerald Ford
 Minority Whip: Leslie C. Arends
 Republican Conference Chairman: Melvin Laird
 Republican Conference Secretary: Richard H. Poff
 Policy Committee Chairman: John Jacob Rhodes
 Republican Campaign Committee Chairman: Bob Wilson

Caucuses
 House Democratic Caucus
 Senate Democratic Caucus

Members
This list is arranged by chamber, then by state. Senators are listed by their classes, and representatives are listed by district.

Senate
Senators are popularly elected statewide every two years, with one-third beginning new six-year terms with each Congress. Preceding the names in the list below are Senate class numbers, which indicate the cycle of their election. In this Congress, Class 1 meant their term began in the last Congress, requiring re-election in 1970; Class 2 meant their term began with this Congress, requiring re-election in 1972; and Class 3 meant their term ended with this Congress, requiring re-election in 1968.

Alabama
 2. John Sparkman (D)
 3. J. Lister Hill (D)

Alaska
 2. Bob Bartlett (D), until December 11, 1968
 Ted Stevens (R), from December 24, 1968
 3. Ernest Gruening (D)

Arizona
 1. Paul Fannin (R)
 3. Carl Hayden (D)

Arkansas
 2. John L. McClellan (D)
 3. J. William Fulbright (D)

California
 1. George Murphy (R)
 3. Thomas Kuchel (R)

Colorado
 2. Gordon Allott (R)
 3. Peter H. Dominick (R)

Connecticut
 1. Thomas J. Dodd (D)
 3. Abraham Ribicoff (D)

Delaware
 1. John J. Williams (R)
 2. J. Caleb Boggs (R)

Florida
 1. Spessard Holland (D)
 3. George Smathers (D)

Georgia
 2. Richard Russell Jr. (D)
 3. Herman Talmadge (D)

Hawaii
 1. Hiram Fong (R)
 3. Daniel Inouye (D)

Idaho
 2. Leonard B. Jordan (R)
 3. Frank Church (D)

Illinois
 2. Charles H. Percy (R)
 3. Everett Dirksen (R)

Indiana
 1. Vance Hartke (D)
 3. Birch Bayh (D)

Iowa
 2. Jack Miller (R)
 3. Bourke B. Hickenlooper (R)

Kansas
 2. James B. Pearson (R)
 3. Frank Carlson (R)

Kentucky
 2. John Sherman Cooper (R)
 3. Thruston Ballard Morton (R), until December 16, 1968
 Marlow Cook (R), from December 17, 1968

Louisiana
 2. Allen J. Ellender (D)
 3. Russell B. Long (D)

Maine
 1. Edmund Muskie (D)
 2. Margaret Chase Smith (R)

Maryland
 1. Joseph Tydings (D)
 3. Daniel Brewster (D)

Massachusetts
 1. Ted Kennedy (D)
 2. Edward Brooke (R)

Michigan
 1. Philip Hart (D)
 2. Robert P. Griffin (R)

Minnesota
 1. Eugene McCarthy (DFL)
 2. Walter Mondale (DFL)

Mississippi
 1. John C. Stennis (D)
 2. James Eastland (D)

Missouri
 1. Stuart Symington (D)
 3. Edward V. Long (D), until December 27, 1968
 Thomas Eagleton (D), from December 28, 1968

Montana
 1. Mike Mansfield (D)
 2. Lee Metcalf (D)

Nebraska
 1. Roman Hruska (R)
 2. Carl Curtis (R)

Nevada
 1. Howard Cannon (D)
 3. Alan Bible (D)

New Hampshire
 2. Thomas J. McIntyre (D)
 3. Norris Cotton (R)

New Jersey
 1. Harrison A. Williams (D)
 2. Clifford P. Case (R)

New Mexico
 1. Joseph Montoya (D)
 2. Clinton Anderson (D)

New York
 1. Robert F. Kennedy (D), until June 6, 1968
 Charles Goodell (R), from September 10, 1968
 3. Jacob Javits (R)

North Carolina
 2. B. Everett Jordan (D)
 3. Sam Ervin (D)

North Dakota
 1. Quentin Burdick (D-NPL)
 3. Milton Young (R)

Ohio
 1. Stephen M. Young (D)
 3. Frank Lausche (D)

Oklahoma
 2. Fred R. Harris (D)
 3. Mike Monroney (D)

Oregon
 2. Mark Hatfield (R), from January 10, 1967
 3. Wayne Morse (D)

Pennsylvania
 1. Hugh Scott (R)
 3. Joseph S. Clark Jr. (D)

Rhode Island
 1. John Pastore (D)
 2. Claiborne Pell (D)

South Carolina
 2. Strom Thurmond (R)
 3. Fritz Hollings (D)

South Dakota
 2. Karl Mundt (R)
 3. George McGovern (D)

Tennessee
 1. Albert Gore Sr. (D)
 2. Howard Baker (R)

Texas
 1. Ralph Yarborough (D)
 2. John Tower (R)

Utah
 1. Frank Moss (D)
 3. Wallace F. Bennett (R)

Vermont
 1. Winston L. Prouty (R)
 3. George Aiken (R)

Virginia
 1. Harry F. Byrd Jr. (D)
 2. William Spong Jr. (D)

Washington
 1. Henry M. Jackson (D)
 3. Warren Magnuson (D)

West Virginia
 1. Robert Byrd (D)
 2. Jennings Randolph (D)

Wisconsin
 1. William Proxmire (D)
 3. Gaylord Nelson (D)

Wyoming
 1. Gale W. McGee (D)
 2. Clifford Hansen (R)

House of Representatives
The names of members of the House of Representatives elected statewide on the general ticket or otherwise at-large, are preceded by an "At-large," and the names of those elected from districts, whether plural or single member, are preceded by their district numbers.

Alabama
 . Jack Edwards (R)
 . William Louis Dickinson (R)
 . George W. Andrews (D)
 . Bill Nichols (D)
 . Armistead I. Selden Jr. (D)
 . John Hall Buchanan Jr. (R)
 . Tom Bevill (D)
 . Robert E. Jones Jr. (D)

Alaska
 . Howard Wallace Pollock (R)

Arizona
 . John Jacob Rhodes (R)
 . Mo Udall (D)
 . Sam Steiger (R)

Arkansas
 . Ezekiel C. Gathings (D)
 . Wilbur Mills (D)
 . John Paul Hammerschmidt (R)
 . David Pryor (D)

California
 . Donald H. Clausen (R)
 . Harold T. Johnson (D)
 . John E. Moss (D)
 . Robert Leggett (D)
 . Phillip Burton (D)
 . William S. Mailliard (R)
 . Jeffery Cohelan (D)
 . George P. Miller (D)
 . Don Edwards (D)
 . Charles Gubser (R)
 . J. Arthur Younger (R), until June 20, 1967
 Pete McCloskey (R), from December 12, 1967
 . Burt Talcott (R)
 . Charles M. Teague (R)
 . Jerome Waldie (D)
 . John J. McFall (D)
 . B. F. Sisk (D)
 . Cecil R. King (D)
 . Bob Mathias (R)
 . Chester E. Holifield (D)
 . H. Allen Smith (R)
 . Augustus Hawkins (D)
 . James C. Corman (D)
 . Del M. Clawson (R)
 . Glenard P. Lipscomb (R)
 . Charles E. Wiggins (R)
 . Thomas M. Rees (D)
 . Edwin Reinecke (R)
 . Alphonzo E. Bell Jr. (R)
 . George Brown Jr. (D)
 . Edward R. Roybal (D)
 . Charles H. Wilson (D)
 . Craig Hosmer (R)
 . Jerry Pettis (R)
 . Richard T. Hanna (D)
 . James B. Utt (R)
 . Bob Wilson (R)
 . Lionel Van Deerlin (D)
 . John V. Tunney (D)

Colorado
 . Byron G. Rogers (D)
 . Donald G. Brotzman (R)
 . Frank Evans (D)
 . Wayne N. Aspinall (D)

Connecticut
 . Emilio Q. Daddario (D)
 . William St. Onge (D)
 . Robert Giaimo (D)
 . Donald J. Irwin (D)
 . John S. Monagan (D)
 . Thomas Meskill (R)

Delaware
 . William Roth (R)

Florida
 . Bob Sikes (D)
 . Don Fuqua (D)
 . Charles E. Bennett (D)
 . Syd Herlong (D)
 . Edward Gurney (R)
 . Sam Gibbons (D)
 . James A. Haley (D)
 . William C. Cramer (R)
 . Paul Rogers (D)
 . J. Herbert Burke (R)
 . Claude Pepper (D)
 . Dante Fascell (D)

Georgia
 . George Elliott Hagan (D)
 . Maston E. O'Neal Jr. (D)
 . Jack Brinkley (D)
 . Benjamin B. Blackburn (R)
 . Fletcher Thompson (R)
 . John Flynt (D)
 . John William Davis (D)
 . W. S. Stuckey Jr. (D)
 . Phillip M. Landrum (D)
 . Robert Grier Stephens Jr. (D)

Hawaii

Both representatives were elected at-large statewide on a general ticket
 . Spark Matsunaga (D)
 . Patsy Mink (D)

Idaho
 . James A. McClure (R)
 . George V. Hansen (R)

Illinois
 . William L. Dawson (D)
 . Barratt O'Hara (D)
 . William T. Murphy (D)
 . Ed Derwinski (R)
 . John C. Kluczynski (D)
 . Daniel J. Ronan (D)
 . Frank Annunzio (D)
 . Dan Rostenkowski (D)
 . Sidney R. Yates (D)
 . Harold R. Collier (R)
 . Roman Pucinski (D)
 . Robert McClory (R)
 . Donald Rumsfeld (R)
 . John N. Erlenborn (R)
 . Charlotte Thompson Reid (R)
 . John B. Anderson (R)
 . Leslie C. Arends (R)
 . Robert H. Michel (R)
 . Tom Railsback (R)
 . Paul Findley (R)
 . Kenneth J. Gray (D)
 . William L. Springer (R)
 . George E. Shipley (D)
 . Melvin Price (D)

Indiana
 . Ray Madden (D)
 . Charles A. Halleck (R)
 . John Brademas (D)
 . E. Ross Adair (R)
 . J. Edward Roush (D)
 . William G. Bray (R)
 . John T. Myers (R)
 . Roger H. Zion (R)
 . Lee Hamilton (D)
 . Richard L. Roudebush (R)
 . Andrew Jacobs Jr. (D)

Iowa
 . Fred Schwengel (R)
 . John Culver (D)
 . H.  R. Gross (R)
 . John Henry Kyl (R)
 . Neal Smith (D)
 . Wiley Mayne (R)
 . William J. Scherle (R)

Kansas
 . Bob Dole (R)
 . Chester L. Mize (R)
 . Larry Winn (R)
 . Garner E. Shriver (R)
 . Joe Skubitz (R)

Kentucky
 . Frank Stubblefield (D)
 . William Natcher (D)
 . William Cowger (R)
 . Gene Snyder (R)
 . Tim Lee Carter (R)
 . John C. Watts (D)
 . Carl D. Perkins (D)

Louisiana
 . F. Edward Hébert (D)
 . Hale Boggs (D)
 . Edwin E. Willis (D)
 . Joe Waggonner (D)
 . Otto Passman (D)
 . John Rarick (D)
 . Edwin Edwards (D)
 . Speedy O. Long (D)

Maine
 . Peter Kyros (D)
 . William Hathaway (D)

Maryland
 . Rogers Morton (R)
 . Clarence Long (D)
 . Edward Garmatz (D)
 . George Hyde Fallon (D)
 . Hervey Machen (D)
 . Charles Mathias (R)
 . Samuel Friedel (D)
 . Gilbert Gude (R)

Massachusetts
 . Silvio O. Conte (R)
 . Edward Boland (D)
 . Philip J. Philbin (D)
 . Harold Donohue (D)
 . F. Bradford Morse (R)
 . William H. Bates (R)
 . Torbert Macdonald (D)
 . Tip O'Neill (D)
 . John W. McCormack (D)
 . Margaret Heckler (R)
 . James A. Burke (D)
 . Hastings Keith (R)

Michigan
 . John Conyers (D)
 . Marvin L. Esch (R)
 . Garry E. Brown (R)
 . J. Edward Hutchinson (R)
 . Gerald Ford (R)
 . Charles E. Chamberlain (R)
 . Donald Riegle (R)
 . R. James Harvey (R)
 . Guy Vander Jagt (R)
 . Elford Albin Cederberg (R)
 . Philip Ruppe (R)
 . James G. O'Hara (D)
 . Charles Diggs (D)
 . Lucien Nedzi (D)
 . William D. Ford (D)
 . John Dingell (D)
 . Martha Griffiths (D)
 . William Broomfield (R)
 . Jack H. McDonald (R)

Minnesota
 . Al Quie (R)
 . Ancher Nelsen (R)
 . Clark MacGregor (R)
 . Joseph Karth (DFL)
 . Donald M. Fraser (DFL)
 . John M. Zwach (R)
 . Odin Langen (R)
 . John Blatnik (DFL)

Mississippi
 . Thomas Abernethy (D)
 . Jamie Whitten (D)
 . John Bell Williams (D), until January 16, 1968
 Charles H. Griffin (D), from March 12, 1968
 . Sonny Montgomery (D)
 . William M. Colmer (D)

Missouri
 . Frank M. Karsten (D)
 . Thomas B. Curtis (R)
 . Leonor Sullivan (D)
 . William J. Randall (D)
 . Richard Walker Bolling (D)
 . William Raleigh Hull Jr. (D)
 . Durward Gorham Hall (R)
 . Richard Howard Ichord Jr. (D)
 . William L. Hungate (D)
 . Paul C. Jones (D)

Montana
 . Arnold Olsen (D)
 . James F. Battin (R)

Nebraska
 . Robert Vernon Denney (R)
 . Glenn Cunningham (R)
 . David Martin (R)

Nevada
 . Walter S. Baring Jr. (D)

New Hampshire
 . Louis C. Wyman (R)
 . James Colgate Cleveland (R)

New Jersey
 . John E. Hunt (R)
 . Charles W. Sandman Jr. (R)
 . James J. Howard (D)
 . Frank Thompson (D)
 . Peter Frelinghuysen Jr. (R)
 . William T. Cahill (R)
 . William B. Widnall (R)
 . Charles Samuel Joelson (D)
 . Henry Helstoski (D)
 . Peter W. Rodino (D)
 . Joseph Minish (D)
 . Florence P. Dwyer (R)
 . Cornelius Gallagher (D)
 . Dominick V. Daniels (D)
 . Edward J. Patten (D)

New Mexico
 . Thomas G. Morris (D)
 . E. S. Johnny Walker (D)

New York
 . Otis G. Pike (D)
 . James R. Grover Jr. (R)
 . Lester L. Wolff (D)
 . John W. Wydler (R)
 . Herbert Tenzer (D)
 . Seymour Halpern (R)
 . Joseph P. Addabbo (D)
 . Benjamin Stanley Rosenthal (D)
 . James J. Delaney (D)
 . Emanuel Celler (D)
 . Frank J. Brasco (D)
 . Edna F. Kelly (D)
 . Abraham J. Multer (D), until December 31, 1967
 Bertram L. Podell (D), from February 20, 1968
 . John J. Rooney (D)
 . Hugh Carey (D)
 . John M. Murphy (D)
 . Theodore R. Kupferman (R)
 . Adam Clayton Powell Jr. (D), until February 28, 1967, and from April 11, 1967
 . Leonard Farbstein (D)
 . William Fitts Ryan (D)
 . James H. Scheuer (D)
 . Jacob H. Gilbert (D)
 . Jonathan Brewster Bingham (D)
 . Paul A. Fino (R), until December 31, 1968
 . Richard Ottinger (D)
 . Ogden Reid (R)
 . John G. Dow (D)
 . Joseph Y. Resnick (D)
 . Daniel E. Button (R)
 . Carleton J. King (R)
 . Robert C. McEwen (R)
 . Alexander Pirnie (R)
 . Howard W. Robison (R)
 . James M. Hanley (D)
 . Samuel S. Stratton (D)
 . Frank Horton (R)
 . Barber Conable (R)
 . Charles Goodell (R), until September 9, 1968
 . Richard D. McCarthy (D)
 . Henry P. Smith III (R)
 . Thaddeus J. Dulski (D)

North Carolina
 . Walter B. Jones Sr. (D)
 . Lawrence H. Fountain (D)
 . David N. Henderson (D)
 . Jim Gardner (R)
 . Nick Galifianakis (D)
 . Horace R. Kornegay (D)
 . Alton Lennon (D)
 . Charles R. Jonas (R)
 . Jim Broyhill (R)
 . Basil Lee Whitener (D)
 . Roy A. Taylor (D)

North Dakota
 . Mark Andrews (R)
 . Thomas S. Kleppe (R)

Ohio
 . Robert Taft Jr. (R)
 . Donald D. Clancy (R)
 . Charles W. Whalen Jr. (R)
 . William Moore McCulloch (R)
 . Del Latta (R)
 . Bill Harsha (R)
 . Bud Brown (R)
 . Jackson Edward Betts (R)
 . Thomas L. Ashley (D)
 . Clarence E. Miller (R)
 . J. William Stanton (R)
 . Samuel L. Devine (R)
 . Charles Adams Mosher (R)
 . William Hanes Ayres (R)
 . Chalmers Wylie (R)
 . Frank T. Bow (R)
 . John M. Ashbrook (R)
 . Wayne Hays (D)
 . Michael J. Kirwan (D)
 . Michael A. Feighan (D)
 . Charles Vanik (D)
 . Frances P. Bolton (R)
 . William Edwin Minshall Jr. (R)
 . Donald "Buz" Lukens (R)

Oklahoma
 . Page Belcher (R)
 . Ed Edmondson (D)
 . Carl Albert (D)
 . Tom Steed (D)
 . John Jarman (D)
 . James V. Smith (R)

Oregon
 . Wendell Wyatt (R)
 . Al Ullman (D)
 . Edith Green (D)
 . John R. Dellenback (R)

Pennsylvania
 . William A. Barrett (D)
 . Robert N. C. Nix Sr. (D)
 . James A. Byrne (D)
 . Joshua Eilberg (D)
 . William J. Green III (D)
 . George M. Rhodes (D)
 . Lawrence G. Williams (R)
 . Edward G. Biester Jr. (R)
 . George Watkins (R)
 . Joseph M. McDade (R)
 . Daniel Flood (D)
 . J. Irving Whalley (R)
 . Richard Schweiker (R)
 . William S. Moorhead (D)
 . Fred B. Rooney (D)
 . Edwin Duing Eshleman (R)
 . Herman T. Schneebeli (R)
 . Robert J. Corbett (R)
 . George Atlee Goodling (R)
 . Elmer J. Holland (D), until August 9, 1968
 Joseph M. Gaydos (D), from November 5, 1968
 . John Herman Dent (D)
 . John P. Saylor (R)
 . Albert W. Johnson (R)
 . Joseph P. Vigorito (D)
 . Frank M. Clark (D)
 . Thomas E. Morgan (D)
 . James G. Fulton (R)

Rhode Island
 . Fernand St. Germain (D)
 . John E. Fogarty (D), until January 10, 1967
 Robert Tiernan (D), from March 28, 1967

South Carolina
 . L. Mendel Rivers (D)
 . Albert Watson (R)
 . William Jennings Bryan Dorn (D)
 . Robert T. Ashmore (D)
 . Thomas S. Gettys (D)
 . John L. McMillan (D)

South Dakota
 . Ben Reifel (R)
 . Ellis Yarnal Berry (R)

Tennessee
 . Jimmy Quillen (R)
 . John Duncan Sr. (R)
 . Bill Brock (R)
 . Joe L. Evins (D)
 . Richard Fulton (D)
 . William Anderson (D)
 . Ray Blanton (D)
 . Fats Everett (D)
 . Dan Kuykendall (R)

Texas
 . Wright Patman (D)
 . John Dowdy (D)
 . Joe R. Pool (D), until July 14, 1968
 James M. Collins (R), from August 24, 1968
 . Ray Roberts (D)
 . Earle Cabell (D)
 . Olin E. Teague (D)
 . George H. W. Bush (R)
 . Robert C. Eckhardt (D)
 . Jack Brooks (D)
 . J. J. Pickle (D)
 . William R. Poage (D)
 . Jim Wright (D)
 . Graham B. Purcell Jr. (D)
 . John Andrew Young (D)
 . Kika de la Garza (D)
 . Richard Crawford White (D)
 . Omar Burleson (D)
 . Bob Price (R)
 . George H. Mahon (D)
 . Henry B. González (D)
 . O. C. Fisher (D)
 . Robert R. Casey (D)
 . Abraham Kazen (D)

Utah
 . Laurence J. Burton (R)
 . Sherman P. Lloyd (R)

Vermont
 . Robert Stafford (R)

Virginia
 . Thomas N. Downing (D)
 . Porter Hardy Jr. (D)
 . David E. Satterfield III (D)
 . Watkins Abbitt (D)
 . William M. Tuck (D)
 . Richard Harding Poff (R)
 . John Otho Marsh Jr. (D)
 . William L. Scott (R)
 . William C. Wampler (R)
 . Joel Broyhill (R)

Washington
 . Thomas Pelly (R)
 . Lloyd Meeds (D)
 . Julia Butler Hansen (D)
 . Catherine Dean May (R)
 . Tom Foley (D)
 . Floyd Hicks (D)
 . Brock Adams (D)

West Virginia
 . Arch A. Moore Jr. (R)
 . Harley Orrin Staggers (D)
 . John M. Slack Jr. (D)
 . Ken Hechler (D)
 . James Kee (D)

Wisconsin
 . Henry C. Schadeberg (R)
 . Robert Kastenmeier (D)
 . Vernon Wallace Thomson (R)
 . Clement J. Zablocki (D)
 . Henry S. Reuss (D)
 . William A. Steiger (R)
 . Melvin Laird (R)
 . John W. Byrnes (R)
 . Glenn Robert Davis (R)
 . Alvin O'Konski (R)

Wyoming
 . William Henry Harrison III (R)

Non-voting member 
 . Santiago Polanco-Abreu (Resident Commissioner) (PPD)

Changes in membership
The count below reflects changes from the beginning of the first session of this Congress.

Senate

 Replacements: 4
 Democratic: 2 seat net loss
 Republican: 2 seat net gain
 Deaths: 2
 Resignations: 2
 Total seats with changes: 5

|-
| Oregon(2)
| Vacant
| Delayed taking seat to finish term as Governor of Oregon.
|  | Mark Hatfield (R)
| January 10, 1967

|-
| New York(1)
|  | Robert F. Kennedy (D)
| Assassinated June 6, 1968, while campaigning for the Democratic presidential nomination.Successor was appointed to continue the term.
|  | Charles Goodell (R)
| September 10, 1968

|-
| Alaska(2)
|  | Bob Bartlett (D)
| Died December 11, 1968Successor was appointed to continue the term.
|  | Ted Stevens (R)
| December 24, 1968

|-
| Kentucky(3)
|  | Thruston Ballard Morton (R)
| Resigned December 16, 1968, to give successor preferential seniority, having already retired.Successor was appointed to finish the term, having already been elected to the next term.
|  | Marlow Cook (R)
| December 17, 1968

|-
| Missouri(3)
|  | Edward V. Long (D)
| Resigned December 27, 1968, having lost renomination to the next term.Successor was appointed to finish the term, having already been elected to the next term.
|  | Thomas Eagleton (D)
| December 28, 1968

|}

House of Representatives

 Replacements: 6
 Democratic: 1 seat net loss
 Republican: 1 seat net gain
 Deaths: 4
 Resignations: 4
 Expulsion: 1
 Total seats with changes: 9

|- 
| 
|  nowrap| John E. Fogarty (D)
| style="font-size:80%" | Died January 10, 1967
|  nowrap | Robert Tiernan (D)
| March 28, 1967
|- 
| 
|  nowrap| Adam Clayton Powell Jr. (D)
| style="font-size:80%" | Excluded from House February 28, 1967, pursuant to H. Res. 278
|  nowrap | Adam Clayton Powell Jr. (D)
| April 11, 1967
|- 
| 
|  nowrap| J. Arthur Younger (R)
| style="font-size:80%" | Died June 20, 1967
|  nowrap | Pete McCloskey (R)
| December 12, 1967
|- 
| 
|  nowrap| Abraham J. Multer (D)
| style="font-size:80%" | Resigned December 31, 1967, after being elected as judge of New York Supreme Court
|  nowrap | Bertram L. Podell (D)
| February 20, 1968
|- 
| 
|  nowrap| John Bell Williams (D)
| style="font-size:80%" | Resigned January 16, 1968, after being elected Governor of Mississippi
|  nowrap | Charles H. Griffin (D)
| March 12, 1968
|- 
| 
|  nowrap| Joe R. Pool (D)
| style="font-size:80%" | Died July 14, 1968
|  nowrap | James M. Collins (R)
| August 24, 1968
|- 
| 
|  nowrap| Elmer J. Holland (D)
| style="font-size:80%" | Died August 9, 1968
|  nowrap | Joseph M. Gaydos (D)
| November 5, 1968
|- 
| 
|  nowrap| Charles Goodell (R)
| style="font-size:80%" | Resigned September 9, 1968, after becoming U.S. Senator
| rowspan=2 |Vacant
| rowspan=2 |Not filled this term
|- 
| 
|  nowrap| Paul A. Fino (R)
| style="font-size:80%" | Resigned December 31, 1968
|}

Committees

Senate

 Aeronautical and Space Sciences (Chair: Clinton P. Anderson; Ranking Member: Margaret Chase Smith)
 Agriculture and Forestry (Chair: Allen J. Ellender; Ranking Member: George D. Aiken)
 Appropriations (Chair: Carl Hayden; Ranking Member: Milton R. Young)
 Armed Services (Chair: Richard B. Russell; Ranking Member: Margaret Chase Smith)
 Banking and Currency (Chair: John J. Sparkman; Ranking Member: Wallace F. Bennett)
 Commerce (Chair: Warren G. Magnuson; Ranking Member: Norris Cotton)
 District of Columbia (Chair: Alan Bible; Ranking Member: Winston L. Prouty)
 Finance (Chair: Russell B. Long; Ranking Member: John J. Williams)
 Foreign Relations (Chair: J. William Fulbright; Ranking Member: Bourke B. Hickenlooper)
 Government Operations (Chair: John Little McClellan; Ranking Member: Karl E. Mundt)
 Interior and Insular Affairs (Chair: Henry M. Jackson; Ranking Member: Thomas H. Kuchel)
 Judiciary (Chair: James O. Eastland; Ranking Member: Everett Dirksen)
 Nutrition and Human Needs (Select) (Chair: George S. McGovern;)
 Organization of Congress (Select)
 Post Office and Civil Service (Chair: Mike Monroney; Ranking Member: Frank Carlson)
 Public Works (Chair: Jennings Randolph; Ranking Member: John Sherman Cooper)
 Rules and Administration (Chair: B. Everett Jordan; Ranking Member: Carl T. Curtis)
 Small Business (Select) (Chair: George A. Smathers)
 Standards and Conduct (Select) (Chair: John C. Stennis)
 Whole

House of Representatives

 Agriculture (Chair: William R. Poage; Ranking Member: Page Belcher)
 Appropriations (Chair: George H. Mahon; Ranking Member: Frank T. Bow)
 Armed Services (Chair: L. Mendel Rivers; Ranking Member: William H. Bates)
 Banking and Currency (Chair: Wright Patman; Ranking Member: William B. Widnall)
 District of Columbia (Chair: John L. McMillan; Ranking Member: Ancher Nelsen)
 Education and Labor (Chair: Carl D. Perkins; Ranking Member: William H. Ayres)
 Foreign Affairs (Chair: Thomas E. Morgan; Ranking Member: Frances P. Bolton)
 Government Operations (Chair: William L. Dawson; Ranking Member: Florence P. Dwyer)
 House Administration (Chair: Omar Burleson; Ranking Member: Glenard P. Lipscomb)
 House Beauty Shop (Select) (Chair: Martha W. Griffiths)
 Interior and Insular Affairs (Chair: Wayne N. Aspinall; Ranking Member: John P. Saylor)
 Interstate and Foreign Commerce (Chair: Harley O. Staggers; Ranking Member: William L. Springer)
 Judiciary (Chair: Emanuel Celler; Ranking Member: William M. McCulloch)
 Merchant Marine and Fisheries (Chair: Edward A. Garmatz; Ranking Member: William S. Mailliard)
 Post Office and Civil Service (Chair: Thaddeus J. Dulski; Ranking Member: Robert J. Corbett)
 Public Works (Chair: George Hyde Fallon; Ranking Member: William C. Cramer)
 Rules (Chair: William M. Colmer; Ranking Member: H. Allen Smith) 
 Science and Astronautics (Chair: George Paul Miller; Ranking Member: James G. Fulton)
 Small Business (Select) (Chair: Joe L. Evins)
 Standards of Official Conduct (Chair: Charles Melvin Price)
 Un-American Activities (Chair: Edwin E. Willis; Ranking Member: John M. Ashbrook)
 Veterans' Affairs (Chair: Olin E. Teague; Ranking Member: E. Ross Adair)
 Ways and Means (Chair: Wilbur D. Mills; Ranking Member: John W. Byrnes)
 Whole

Joint committees

 Atomic Energy (Chair: Sen. John O. Pastore; Vice Chair: Rep. Chet Holifield) 
 Conditions of Indian Tribes (Special)
 Defense Production (Chair: Rep. Wright Patman; Vice Chair: Sen. John J. Sparkman)
 Disposition of Executive Papers 
 Economic (Chair: Sen. William Proxmire; Vice Chair: Rep. Wright Patman)
 Immigration and Nationality Policy (Chair: Rep. Michael A. Feighan)
 Legislative Budget
 The Library (Chair: Sen. B. Everett Jordan; Vice Chair: Rep. Omar Burleson)
 Navajo-Hopi Indian Administration
 Printing (Chair: Sen. Carl Hayden; Vice Chair: Rep. Omar Burleson)
 Reduction of Nonessential Federal Expenditures (Chair: Rep. George H. Mahon)
 Taxation (Chair: Rep. Wilbur D. Mills; Vice Chair: Sen. Russell B. Long)

Employees

Legislative branch agency directors
 Architect of the Capitol: J. George Stewart
 Attending Physician of the United States Congress: Rufus Pearson 
 Comptroller General of the United States: Elmer B. Staats
 Librarian of Congress: Lawrence Quincy Mumford 
 Public Printer of the United States: James L. Harrison

Senate
 Chaplain: Frederick Brown Harris (Methodist)
 Curator: Joseph Dougherty, until 1968
 Richard A. Baker (acting), from 1968
 Parliamentarian: Floyd Riddick
 Secretary: Francis R. Valeo
 Librarian: Richard D. Hupman
 Democratic Party Secretary: J. Stanley Kimmitt
 Republican Party Secretary: J. Mark Trice
 Sergeant at Arms: Robert G. Dunphy

House of Representatives
 Chaplain: Edward G. Latch (Methodist)
 Clerk: W. Pat Jennings
 Doorkeeper: William M. Miller
 Parliamentarian: Lewis Deschler
 Postmaster: H. H. Morris
 Reading Clerks: Charles W. Hackney Jr. (D) and Joe Bartlett (R) 
 Sergeant at Arms: Zeake W. Johnson Jr.

See also
 1966 United States elections (elections leading to this Congress)
 1966 United States Senate elections
 1966 United States House of Representatives elections
 1968 United States elections (elections during this Congress, leading to the next Congress)
 1968 United States presidential election
 1968 United States Senate elections
 1968 United States House of Representatives elections

Notes

References

External links
 Biographical Directory of the U.S. Congress
 U.S. House of Representatives: Congressional History
 U.S. Senate: Statistics and Lists